Fernando Díez Molina (born 23 September 1974, in Madrid) is a Spanish former rugby union player. He played as a centre. Currently, as from 2013, he coaches the CR Liceo Francés.

Career
His first international cap was during a match against Czech Republic, at Santander, on 30 November 1997. He was part of the 1999 Rugby World Cup roster, where he was the only player of Liceo Francés. In the tournament he played just one match. His last international cap was during a match against Portugal, at Coimbra, on 23 March 2003.

Coaching career
In 2012 he was appointed as coach of the Spain national rugby sevens team. However, as from 3 July 2013, he resigned from his position and was appointed coach of CR Liceo Francés.

References

External links
 

1974 births
Living people
Sportspeople from Madrid
Spanish rugby union coaches
Spanish rugby union players
Rugby union centres
Spain international rugby union players
Rugby union players from the Community of Madrid